The SCW Southwest Heavyweight Championship was the top singles title of Southwest Championship Wrestling for most of its existence. It was established as the SCW Southwest Television Championship in 1978 and was renamed in February 1979, and it lasted until the promotion was sold to Texas All-Star Wrestling in 1985, at which point the title was abandoned.

Title history
Silver areas in the history indicate periods of unknown lineage.

References

External links
SWCW Southwest Heavyweight title history

Southwest Heavyweight Championship
Heavyweight wrestling championships
Regional professional wrestling championships